Giuseppe Cassì (born 11 April 1963 in Catania) is an Italian politician, lawyer and former professional basketball player.

As a professional basketball player he played 13 seasons in Serie B, Serie A2 e Lega Basket Serie A for the Virtus Ragusa and Pallacanestro Trapani.

Cassì ran as an independent for the office of Mayor of Ragusa at the 2018 Italian local elections, supported by a right-wing coalition with Brothers of Italy and other civic lists. He won and took office on 27 June 2018.

See also
2018 Italian local elections
List of mayors of Ragusa

References

External links
 

1963 births
Italian men's basketball players
Living people
Mayors of places in Sicily
People from Ragusa, Sicily
Shooting guards
Sportspeople from the Province of Ragusa